The Mühlgrundbach is a river of Saxony, Germany. It flows into the Elbe near the Schöna railway station, opposite the village Schmilka.

See also
List of rivers of Saxony

Rivers of Saxony
Rivers of Germany